Burnt Pine (Norf'k: Ban Pain) is the largest town on Norfolk Island (in the Pacific Ocean located between Australia, New Zealand and New Caledonia). It is the main commercial hub of the island, and travel from one side of the island to another generally involves passing through Burnt Pine as the island's sole thoroughfare runs through the town's centre.

Geography
The headwaters of Cascade Creek and Broken Bridge Creek (northern side) and Watermill Creek (southern side) flow from just below the ridge.

History
In 1795, First Fleeter Andrew Goodwin was granted a prime sixty-acre lot (lot 64) on Middlegate and Queen Elizabeth Roads Norfolk Island, where he lived with his wife Lydia (Letitia) Munro and his children until 1802.  A map of 1844 labels the area 'Sheep Station', and a 1904 map shows the area as large rural holdings.  The impetus for founding the town came in 1942 during the Pacific War, when construction of a military aerodrome began (now the Norfolk Island Airport).  This involved the destruction of the convict-planted Pine Avenue for the east–west runway.  Between 1943 and 1944, the Army produced the Burnt Pine News, the first eponymous use of the place name.  By the end of the war, a number of shops and a new hospital had been built around the intersection of Taylors Road and Grassy Road (the original location of the name Burnt Pine), and in 1946, Rawson Hall was built in Taylors Road.  Regular commercial air services from 1946 onwards brought a gradual increase in tourism, and Burnt Pine was well placed on the airport edge for siting new guest houses and shops, such as Holloway's 'Sample Rooms', a tea shop that operated on a rise in Taylors Road known as Holloways Hill.  A new hospital was built in 1952 on the Grassy Road corner.  The expansion of the town matched the growth of the tourism industry.  Development spread eastwards along Taylors Road:  Prentice's duty-free shop opened on Taylors Road in 1953, as did the 'Leeside' store near the New Cascade Road corner.  The tourist boom started in the mid-1960s, and as the town spread, the name Burnt Pine followed and now refers to the whole urbanised area.

Urban layout 
The town has a ribbon development form strung along Taylors Road, with its boundaries marked by cattle grids on Taylors Road, New Cascade Road, Grassy Road, Douglas Drive and Ferny Lane.  Central Taylors Road around the intersection with New Cascade Road forms the town's High Street or CBD and contains its major infrastructure.   Shops, cafes, offices, service clubs, several tourist resort complexes and a few residential properties line both sides of the street.  The Bicentennial Complex on Taylors Road contains the main public buildings (Visitor Centre, Post Office, Customs & Immigration Offices and Liquor Bond Store), Rawson Hall and the Lions Park sports grounds and oval.  Other public buildings are the Norfolk Island Hospital on Grassy Road and the Norfolk Telecom Offices on New Cascade Road.  There are no real side streets or blocks below the ridge. Taylors Road merges into Douglas Drive and the Norfolk Island Airport marking the western edge of the town.  The town's buildings mainly date from the 1970s and 1980s and are mainly single storied, sitting low in the landscape.

Population
Census population figures are not available for the various districts of Norfolk Island.  The population of Burnt Pine was estimated to be  in 2007.

Municipal governance 
There is no level of municipal governance in Norfolk Island, and the town has no formal boundaries.  The Chamber of Commerce provides an avenue for involvement by business people in lobbying the Territory government for improved facilities and maintenance of public spaces.  The town has no distinctive emblems or heraldry.

Nearby towns and hamlets 
Middlegate, the site of Norfolk Island Central School, is a hamlet on the eastern fringe of Burnt Pine. Middlegate's main street is Queen Elizabeth Avenue, running from Taylors Road to the Middlegate Crossroads. The school is located at the crossroads, as is the Bounty Folk Museum, formerly Uncle Joe Jenkins General Store. Several tourist resorts have a Queen Elizabeth Avenue address whereas the main public space is the Queen Victoria Gardens.

Notable sites in Burnt Pine and Middlegate 
Burnt Pine
 Norfolk Island Bowling Club 1939
 Rawson Hall 1946
 South Pacific Hotel
 Lions Park sports grounds and grandstand 1974
 Foodland Mall 1980
 The Bicentennial Complex 1988
 Bounty Square and ship monument 2000
Middlegate
 Bounty Folk Museum 1980
 Governor's Lodge Resort 1998
 Fletcher's Mutiny Cyclorama 2002
 Queen Victoria Gardens 2009

References

Populated places in Norfolk Island